Santa Ernestina is a municipality in the state of São Paulo in Brazil. The population is 5,588 (2020 est.) in an area of 134 km². The elevation is 570 m.

References

Municipalities in São Paulo (state)